Andrew Peter Thomson (born 7 January 1961), an Australian politician, is a former Liberal member of the Australian House of Representatives representing the Division of Wentworth in New South Wales.

Biography
Thomson is the son of the Australian golfer Peter Thomson and worked as a solicitor, investment banker and golf course designer before entering politics. He was educated at the University of Melbourne (arts/law), Keio University in Tokyo and later at Georgetown University Law Center in Washington DC. He entered parliament in April 1995 in a Wentworth by-election after Dr John Hewson vacated the seat when he retired from politics after being dumped from the Downer Shadow Cabinet and not reinstated into Howard's.

When the Coalition took government at the 1996 election, Thomson was made Parliamentary Secretary to the Minister for Foreign Affairs. On 6 October 1997, he became Minister for Sport and Tourism, and Minister Assisting the Prime Minister for the Sydney 2000 Games. Thomson was the first Member of the House of Representatives to speak fluent Japanese and Chinese.

Thomson retired from the seat of Wentworth in 2001 after losing preselection to Peter King. Thereafter, he worked in the United States after passing the New York Bar Exam, then later joined Minter Ellison in Australia as a special counsel. He worked in Singapore, Abu Dhabi, Saudi Arabia and Beijing before returning to live in Tokyo in early 2011 where he had worked in his twenties. Currently, he is registered as a foreign lawyer in Japan and has his own practice in the city of Fukuoka.

References

External links
Thomson's law practice in Japan

1961 births
Living people
Liberal Party of Australia members of the Parliament of Australia
Members of the Australian House of Representatives for Wentworth
Members of the Australian House of Representatives
Keio University alumni
Georgetown University Law Center alumni
Australian solicitors
Australian expatriates in Japan
21st-century Australian politicians
20th-century Australian politicians
Government ministers of Australia
University of Melbourne alumni politicians
Politicians from Melbourne